Dexter Lyndell Boney (born April 27, 1970) is an American former college and professional basketball player.

Biography
He was born on April 27, 1970.

Boney played for Brandywine High School, where he was named all-state three times and holds the boys scoring record in Delaware with over 2,000 points. He played collegiately at Hagerstown Junior College of the NJCAA where he averaged 31.6 points as sophomore, and then for two years at University of Nevada, Las Vegas of the NCAA Division I. He later played eight games with the NBA's Phoenix Suns in February of the 1996–97 NBA season.

Boney won the Continental Basketball Association Most Valuable Player award after ranking fourth in scoring (21.7 points per game) and third in steals (2.1 per game) for the Florida Beachdogs during the CBA's 1996–97 season. He last played with the CBA's Fargo-Moorhead Beez in 2002.

Notes

External links
NBA stats @ databasebasketball.com
Dexter Boney photo

1970 births
Living people
African-American basketball players
American expatriate basketball people in France
American expatriate basketball people in Israel
American expatriate basketball people in Mexico
American expatriate basketball people in the Philippines
American expatriate basketball people in Venezuela
American men's basketball players
Basketball players from Wilmington, Delaware
Besançon BCD players
Ironi Ashkelon players
Dinamo Sassari players
Fargo-Moorhead Beez (CBA) players
Florida Beachdogs players
Guards (basketball)
Idaho Stampede (CBA) players
Israeli Basketball Premier League players
Junior college men's basketball players in the United States
Las Vegas Silver Bandits players
Mexico Aztecas players
Phoenix Suns players
Undrafted National Basketball Association players
UNLV Runnin' Rebels basketball players
Alaska Aces (PBA) players
Philippine Basketball Association imports
Pop Cola Panthers players
21st-century African-American sportspeople
20th-century African-American sportspeople